Parmouti 19 - Coptic Calendar - Parmouti 21

The twentieth day of the Coptic month of Parmouti, the eighth month of the Coptic year. In common years, this day corresponds to April 15, of the Julian Calendar, and April 28, of the Gregorian Calendar. This day falls in the Coptic Season of Shemu, the season of the Harvest.

Commemorations

Martyrs 

 The martyrdom of Saint Paphnute of Dendera

References 

Days of the Coptic calendar